UNAM Choir is a gospel singing group of the University of Namibia. Based in Windhoek, it is the largest choir group in Namibia which represented the country at International shows including in United States and China. The group has produced 3 albums since its inception and in 2017, celebrated its 20th anniversary. It is led by group instructor Bonnie Pereko who has been the group's conductor since 1997.

History
The UNAM Choir was formed in 1992 but only became active in 1997 after the recruitment of Bonnie Pereko who been its lead composer for over 20 years. The group has had international appearances in several African countries including South Africa, Kenya, Zambia, Tanzania and Uganda. It is composed mainly of students from the University of Namibia's Windhoek main campus.

Local Appearances
The Unam Choir has been a pinnacle of performances within Namibia. In 2004, the group  performed at the celebration of then new president Hifikepunye Pohomba. At the 2006 National Theatre of Namibia concert, it won't the number one performance for group category.

International Appearances

The group has represented the country in the United States, China, Kenya and Germany.

Notable present and former members

The Unam Choir has since its formation produced members who have gone on to achieve music careers within Namibia and abroad. Some of them include;
Anne Singer
Mr Bonnie Pereko

See also
UNAM SRC
UNAM Radio

References

A cappella musical groups
Windhoek